Johnson Township is one of ten townships in Knox County, Indiana. As of the 2010 census, its population was 1,382 and it contained 581 housing units.

History
Johnson Township is named for Thomas Johnson, an early pioneer settler who arrived in 1800, settling on land that later became the Purcell Station area. His son Thomas Johnson Jr. expanded the property and married into the Catt family.

Geography
The town of Decker, formerly called Deckertown," is in this township (not Decker Township).

References

External links
 Indiana Township Association
 United Township Association of Indiana

Townships in Knox County, Indiana
Townships in Indiana